Wild Bill Davis & Johnny Hodges in Atlantic City is a live album by American jazz saxophonist Johnny Hodges and organist Wild Bill Davis. The album features performances recorded in Atlantic City in 1966 and was released on the RCA Victor label.

Reception

AllMusic says "This is a top-notch session of top-notch musicians just enjoying one another's company. It's jazz that puts a smile on your face".

Track listing
All compositions by Johnny Hodges except where noted
 "Just Squeeze Me" (Duke Ellington, Lee Gaines) – 4:45 
 "It's Only a Paper Moon" (Harold Arlen, Yip Harburg, Billy Rose) – 2:59
 "Taffy" (Johnny Hodges, Wild Bill Davis) – 5:38
 "Good Queen Bess" – 3:22
 "L B Blues" – 5:40
 "In a Mellow Tone" (Ellington, Milt Gabler) – 3:47
 "Rockville" – 6:36
 "I'll Always Love You" (Davis) – 3:51
 "It Don't Mean a Thing (If It Ain't Got That Swing)" (Ellington, Irving Mills) – 5:40
 "Belle of the Belmont" (Mercer Ellington, Hodges) – 4:58

Personnel
Johnny Hodges – alto saxophone
Wild Bill Davis – organ
Bob Brown – tenor saxophone, flute
Dickie Thompson – guitar
Bobby Durham – drums
Lawrence Brown - trombone

References

Johnny Hodges live albums
Wild Bill Davis live albums
1967 live albums
RCA Records live albums